Magnitogorsk State Technical University is located in Magnitogorsk, Russia. It was founded in 1931.

References

External links 
 Official Website.

Educational institutions established in 1931
Buildings and structures in Chelyabinsk Oblast
Universities in Chelyabinsk Oblast
1931 establishments in Russia
Magnitogorsk